Saint-Martin-de-Restigouche is an unincorporated community in Restigouche County, New Brunswick, Canada.

The local service district of St. Martin de Restigouche takes its name from the community but uses a different spelling.

History

Notable people

See also
List of communities in New Brunswick

References

Communities in Restigouche County, New Brunswick
Local service districts of Restigouche County, New Brunswick